Jaakko Saari (born 3 November 1957) is a Finnish judoka. He competed in the men's open category event at the 1980 Summer Olympics.

References

1957 births
Living people
Finnish male judoka
Olympic judoka of Finland
Judoka at the 1980 Summer Olympics
Sportspeople from Jyväskylä
20th-century Finnish people